Whitehope Law is a hill in the Moorfoot Hills range, part of the Southern Uplands of Scotland. A relatively isolated hill, it is frequently climbed on its own from the B709 road to its south and east. A farm to the south lends its name to the hill.

References

Mountains and hills of the Southern Uplands
Mountains and hills of the Scottish Borders
Donald mountains